"Living in a Lie" is a 2000 song by German rock band Guano Apes from their second album Don't Give Me Names. It was released as the third single from the album on 2 October 2000. The music video shows Sandra singing in a room, interspersed by live and backstage footage of the band performing.

Track listing

CD single
Living in a Lie - 3:38
Rain (Live @ Paradiso) - 5:04
Don't You Turn Your Back On Me - 3:44
Living in a Lie (Album Version) - 4:33
CD-ROM material
Impressions - 1:55
Hotel - 2:39
Canyon -2:31
Toilette - 0:36
Rain (Live Fragments) - 1:26
Interview (German) - 11:45
Interview (English) - 5:24
Living in a Lie - 3:39

Promo single
Living in a Lie (Radio Edit One) - 3:41
Living in a Lie (Radio Edit Two) - 3:20
Living in a Lie (Unplugged) - 4:27
Living in a Lie (Album Version) - 4:33

Charts

References

2000 singles
Guano Apes songs
Pop ballads
Rock ballads
2000 songs